RavenCon is an annual fan-run American science fiction convention founded in 2006 and held in Richmond, Virginia. The name "RavenCon" was chosen as a tribute to author Edgar Allan Poe, who grew up in Richmond.

Early Years (2006–2015)
RavenCon 2006 was held April 21–23, 2006, with Terry Brooks as author guest of honor, Tom Kidd as artist guest of honor, and Lee & Alexis Gilliland as fan guests of honor. The convention took place at the Doubletree Inn at the Richmond Airport in Sandston, Virginia.

RavenCon 2007 was held April 20–22, 2007, with Robert J. Sawyer as author guest of honor, Steve Stiles as artist guest of honor, and jan howard finder (aka Wombat) as fan guest of honor.  The convention took place at the Doubletree Inn at the Richmond Airport in Sandston, Virginia.

RavenCon 2008 was held April 25–27, 2008, with C.S. Friedman as author guest of honor, Stephen Hickman as artist guest of honor, and Erwin Strauss (aka Filthy Pierre) as fan guest of honor. The convention took place at the Crowne Plaza in Richmond, Virginia.

RavenCon 2009 was held April 24–26, 2009, with Jack McDevitt as author guest of honor, Alan F. Beck as artist guest of honor, and R. K. Milholland as comics guest of honor. The convention took place at the Crowne Plaza in Richmond, Virginia.

RavenCon 2010 was held April 9–11, 2010, with Rachel Caine as author guest of honor, R. Cat Conrad as artist guest of honor, and Steve Long as gaming guest of honor.  The convention was held at the Holiday Inn Koger Center in Richmond, Virginia.

RavenCon 2011 was held April 8–10, 2011, with John Ringo as author guest of honor, Kurt Miller as artist guest of honor, and Coyote Run as music guest of honor. The convention was held at the Holiday Inn Koger Center in Richmond, Virginia.

RavenCon 2012 was held April 13–15, 2012, with Glen Cook as author guest of honor, Matthew Stewart as artist guest of honor, and Bella Morte as music guest of honor. The convention was held at the Holiday Inn Koger Center in Richmond, Virginia.

RavenCon 2013 was held April 5–7, 2013, with Kevin J. Anderson and Rebecca Moesta as author guests of honor, Jennie Breeden as artist guest of honor, Bella Morte as music guest of honor, and Carla Brindle as fan guest of honor. The convention was held at the Holiday Inn Koger Center in Richmond, Virginia.

RavenCon 2014 was held April 25–27, 2014, with Elizabeth Bear as author guest of honor, Ed Beard Jr. as artist guest of honor, Lee Garvin (creator of Tales from the Floating Vagabond) as gaming guest of honor, Crunk Witch as music guest of honor, and Stephen H. King as fan guest of honor. The convention was held at the DoubleTree by Hilton Richmond-Midlothian (formerly the Holiday Inn Koger Center) in North Chesterfield, Virginia.

RavenCon 2015 was held April 24–26, 2015, with Allen Steele as author guest of honor, Frank Wu as artist guest of honor, Brianna Wu as gaming guest of honor, and Jack McDevitt and Lawrence M. Schoen as special author guests. Brianna Wu attracted some brief controversy when Gamergate supporters attempted to cause trouble at the convention. The convention was held at the DoubleTree by Hilton Richmond-Midlothian in North Chesterfield, Virginia.

Move from Richmond to Williamsburg

RavenCon 2015 was the last time that RavenCon would be held at the DoubleTree by Hilton Richmond-Midlothian in North Chesterfield, Virginia, when the owner of the hotel, Shamin hotels of Chester, Virginia, asked for a 600 percent increase in rates. Following this, RavenCon moved from Richmond and later events would be held in Williamsburg, Virginia at the DoubleTree by Hilton Williamsburg. Following RavenCon 2015, the convention began to identify by the number of years operating rather than the current year. 

RavenCon 11 was held April 29–May 1, 2017, with Sharon Lee and Steve Miller as author guests of honor, Vincent Di Fate as artist guest of honor, Ted White as a special guest of honor, and Jason Whitt as fan guest of honor. That year, RavenCon also hosted FanHistoricon 13, with a track of panels and guests that focused exclusively on the history of fandom.

RavenCon 12 was held April 28–30, 2017, with Mercedes Lackey as author guest of honor, Larry Dixon as artist guest of honor, Chuck Gannon and Ed Beard Jr. as special guests of honor, Professor Sparks as science guest of honor, and Chris AdottaSmith as fan guest of honor. 

RavenCon 13 was held April 20–22, 2018, with Chuck Wendig as author guest of honor, Mark Cline as artist guest of honor, and The Vailix as music guests of honor.

RavenCon 14 was held April 5–7, 2019, with Melinda M. Snodgrass as author guest of honor, Nikole McDonald-Jones as artist guest of honor, and the Library Bards as music guests of honor.

COVID-19 
RavenCon 15 had been scheduled to take place in April 2020 and was cancelled a few weeks before the convention. It was rescheduled for April 2021 and then cancelled again. To raise money for refunds and to keep the convention operating during the two years of cancellations, authors donated stories for an anthology with the proceeds going to the convention. The fundraiser was successful, and the convention produced CORVID-19: A RavenCon Anthology, edited by Michael D. Pederson.

Concert Events/RavenConcert 
In addition to its annual spring author-focused convention, RavenCon has experimented with music-focused events later in the year.

RavenCon 13.5 was held September 21–23, 2018 at the Four Points Sheraton Richmond, off of Midlothian Turnpike. This was a much smaller convention, with a primary focus on music. R.S. Belcher was author guest of honor, and the music guests of honor were MC Lars, George Hrab, Reverend Billy C. Wirtz, and Misbehavin' Maidens.

RavenCon 14.5 was a one-day outdoor concert held on August 8, 2021 at Virginia Crossings Hotel and Conference Center in Glen Allen, Virginia. Mikey Mason, Dimensional Riffs, Chuck Parker, Dirty Metal Lefty, and Dr. Shock and the Electrodes were the performers.

Return to Richmond 
RavenCon's concert events marked a brief return to Richmond which was made permanent when they signed a contract with Virginia Crossings Hotel and Conference Center in Glen Allen, Virginia. After RavenCon 14.5, all future events would be held in Richmond.

RavenCon 15 was held April 29–May 1, 2022, with Terry Brooks as author guest of honor, and Rhiannon's Lark as music guest of honor. 

RavenCon 16 will be held April 21-23, 2023.

References

External links 

2006 establishments in Virginia
Science fiction conventions in the United States
Culture of Richmond, Virginia
Festivals in Virginia
Tourist attractions in Richmond, Virginia
Recurring events established in 2006